The Washington State Golf Association (WSGA) was established in 1922 and serves as the only official representative of the United States Golf Association (USGA) for Northern Idaho and the state of Washington. The WSGA has over 68,000 members at more than 550 golf courses, throughout Washington and Northern Idaho. Each member of the WSGA is given with an official USGA Handicap Index through the USGA GHIN System.

In September of 2019, the Washington State Golf Association was re-branded as Washington Golf (WA Golf).

Championships 
The WSGA conducts 14 championships for amateur golfers each year.
 Men's Amateur Championship
 Women's Amateur Championship
 Men's Mid-Amateur Championship
 Women's Mid-Amateur Championship
 Senior Men's Amateur Championship
 Senior Women's Amateur Championship
 Super Senior Men's Amateur Championship
 Super Senior Women's Amateur Championship
 Men's Four-Ball Championship
 Senior Men's Four-Ball Championship
 Women's Four-Ball
 Champion of Champions
 Parent-Child Championship
 Mixed Chapman Championship

References

External links 
 Official Website
 United States Golf Association

Golf in Washington (state)
Golf associations